Vanderlei Francisco (born 25 September 1987) is a Brazilian professional footballer who plays as a forward who lastly played for Lagarto.

Club career

Semen Padang
In 2019, Vanderlei signed a contract with Indonesian Liga 1 club Semen Padang. He made 16 league appearances and scored 8 goals for Semen Padang.

Persiraja Banda Aceh
He was signed for Persiraja Banda Aceh to play in the Liga 1 in the 2020 season. Vanderlei played in all of the club's three matches in the 2020 Liga 1 season that abruptly stopped due to the COVID-19 pandemic.

References

External links 
 Vanderlei Francisco at ZeroZero
 

1987 births
Living people
Brazilian footballers
Association football forwards
Campeonato Brasileiro Série A players
Atlético Clube Goianiense players
ABC Futebol Clube players
Daejeon Hana Citizen FC players
Persiraja Banda Aceh players
Lagarto Futebol Clube players
K League 2 players
Brazilian expatriate footballers
Expatriate footballers in South Korea
Brazilian expatriate sportspeople in South Korea
Expatriate footballers in Romania
Brazilian expatriate sportspeople in Romania
Expatriate footballers in Kuwait
Brazilian expatriate sportspeople in Kuwait
Expatriate footballers in Indonesia
Brazilian expatriate sportspeople in Indonesia